Cytoskeleton associated protein 2 like is a protein that in humans is encoded by the CKAP2L gene.

Function

The protein encoded by this gene is thought to be a mitotic spindle protein important to neural stem or progenitor cells. Mutations in this gene have been associated with spindle organization defects, including mitotic spindle defects, lagging chromosomes, and chromatin bridges. There is evidence that mutations in this gene are associated with Filippi syndrome, characterized by growth defects, microcephaly, intellectual disability, facial feature defects, and syndactyly. There is a pseudogene of this gene on chromosome 20. Alternative splicing results in multiple transcript variants. [provided by RefSeq, Jan 2015].

References

Further reading